In structural engineering, Johnson's parabolic formula is an empirically based equation for calculating the critical buckling stress of a column. The formula is based on experimental results by J. B. Johnson from around 1900 as an alternative to Euler's critical load formula under low slenderness ratio (the ratio of radius of gyration to effective length) conditions. 
The equation interpolates between the yield stress of the material to the critical buckling stress given by Euler's formula relating the slenderness ratio to the stress required to buckle a column. 

Buckling refers to a mode of failure in which the structure loses stability. It is caused by a lack of structural stiffness. Placing a load on a long slender bar may cause a buckling failure before the specimen can fail by compression.

Johnson Parabola 
Eulers formula for buckling of a slender column gives the critical stress level to cause buckling but doesn't consider material failure modes such as yield which has been shown to lower the critical buckling stress. Johnson's formula interpolates between the yield stress of the column material and the critical stress given by Euler's formula. It creates a new failure border by fitting a parabola to the graph of failure for Euler buckling using

There is a transition point on the graph of the Euler curve, located at the critical slenderness ratio. At slenderness values lower than this point (occurring in specimens with a relatively short length compared to their cross section), the graph will follow the Johnson parabola; in contrast, larger slenderness values will align more closely with the Euler equation.

Euler's formula is

where
 critical stress, 
 critical force,
 area of cross section,
 Effective length of the rod,
 modulus of elasticity,
 area moment of inertia of the cross section of the rod,
 = slenderness ratio.

Euler's equation is useful in situations such as an ideal pinned-pinned column, or in cases in which the effective length can be used to adjust the existing formula (ie. Fixed-Free).

(L is the original length of the specimen before the force was applied.)

However, certain geometries are not accurately represented by the Euler formula. One of the variables in the above equation that reflects the geometry of the specimen is the slenderness ratio, which is the column's length divided by the radius of gyration.

The slenderness ratio is an indicator of the specimen's resistance to bending and buckling, due to its length and cross section. If the slenderness ratio is less than the critical slenderness ratio, the column is considered to be a short column. In these cases, the Johnson parabola is more applicable than the Euler formula.
The slenderness ratio of the member can be found with  

The critical slenderness ratio is

Example 

One common material in aerospace applications is Al 2024. Certain material properties of Al 2024 have been determined experimentally, such as the tensile yield strength (324 MPa) and the modulus of elasticity (73.1 GPa).  The Euler formula could be used to plot a failure curve, but it would not be accurate below a certain  value, the critical slenderness ratio.

Therefore, the Euler equation is applicable for values of   greater than 66.7.
Euler:  for 
 (units in Pascals)

Johnson's parabola takes care of the smaller  values.
Johnson:  for 

 (units in Pascals)

References 

Elasticity (physics)
Materials science
Mechanical failure modes
Structural analysis
Mechanics